Tapingo was a mobile commerce application that offers advance ordering for pickup and food delivery services for college campuses.
This functionality was merged into the GrubHub mobile application after the acquisition.

The company was acquired by Grubhub in September 2018 for $150 million.

Tapingo is differentiated from other on-demand delivery/logistics companies, such as Waiter.com, Postmates, or DoorDash, by focusing its efforts on serving the college market. Through Tapingo, users can browse menus, place orders, pay for the meal and schedule the pickup or have it delivered. On certain campuses, students are able to use their university's meal dollars to pay for food.

In the spring of 2012, Tapingo first launched its services on five campuses (Santa Clara University, Loyola Marymount University, Biola University, the University of Maine, and California Lutheran University), and has since expanded to more than 200 college campuses across the U.S. and Canada, serving 100 markets. To date, Tapingo has received venture funding from Carmel Ventures, Khosla Ventures, Kinzon Capital, DCM Ventures and Qualcomm Ventures.

In fall 2015, Tapingo announced expansion plans through major partnership deals with national brands like Chipotle Mexican Grill and 7-Eleven, regional restaurants such as Taco Bueno, and global foodservice provider Aramark.

References

External links
 

Online food retailers of the United States
Companies based in San Francisco